Dailodontus is a genus of beetles in the family Carabidae, containing the following species:

 Dailodontus cayennensis (Dejean, 1826)
 Dailodontus clandestinus (Klug, 1834)

References

Anthiinae (beetle)